NA-247 Karachi Central-I is a constituency for the National Assembly of Pakistan that encompasses most of New Karachi.

Members of Parliament

2018-2022: NA-253 Karachi Central-I

Election 2002 

General elections were held on 10 Oct 2002.Syed Haider Abbas Rizvi of Muttahida Qaumi Movement won by 54,101 votes.

Election 2008 

General elections were held on 18 Feb 2008. Sheikh Salahuddin of Muttahida Qaumi Movement won by 174,044 votes.

Election 2013 

General elections were held on 11 May 2013. Sheikh Salahuddin  of Muttahida Qaumi Movement won by 133,885 votes and became the member of National Assembly.

Election 2018 

General elections were held on 25 July 2018.

†MQM-P is considered heir apparent to MQM

See also
NA-246 Karachi West-III
NA-248 Karachi Central-II

References

External links 
Election result's official website

NA-244
Karachi